Lieutenant General Joseph Jacques Charles "Charlie" Bouchard (born 1956)  is a retired Royal Canadian Air Force general.  He has served as Commander of 1 Canadian Air Division / Canadian NORAD Region, the Deputy Commander of North American Aerospace Defense Command (NORAD) and Deputy Commander of Allied Joint Force Command Naples.  On 25 March 2011, Bouchard was named Commander of the NATO military mission in Libya.

Biography
Joseph Jacques Charles Bouchard was born in the Chicoutimi borough of Saguenay, Quebec, Canada. He enrolled with the Canadian Forces in 1974 under the Officer Candidate Training Plan. After helicopter training, Bouchard qualified in 1976 as a helicopter pilot.

Bouchard has had a long career in Tactical Aviation within Canadian Forces Air Command, which included flying positions in several squadrons, command of 444 Tactical Helicopter Squadron at Lahr in Germany, and command of 1 Wing Kingston. Bouchard has served in the United States as Deputy Commander for Continental NORAD Region and was standing duty at Tyndall Air Force Base conducting Air Operation on 11 September 2001. Bouchard would later become Deputy Commander of 1 Canadian Air Division, and from August 2007 to June 2009, Deputy Commander of North American Aerospace Defense Command, receiving promotion to Lieutenant-General on taking up the appointment. In 2009, he assumed the position of Deputy Commander, Allied Joint Force Command Naples.

On 25 March 2011, while continuing to serve at Naples, Bouchard was named Commander of "Operation Unified Protector", NATO's military intervention in Libya. The Libya mission provided air cover to overthrow the country's long-time national leader Muammar Gaddafi — a mission in which fighter jets played a massive role.  Bouchard was replaced in October 2011 as Deputy Commander Allied JFC Naples by a fellow Canadian Marquis Hainse, the position having fallen vacant while Bouchard served as the Commander of the NATO mission in Libya.

Bouchard is a graduate of Canadian Forces Staff School; Canadian Land Forces Command and Staff College; Canadian Forces Command and Staff College; the National Strategic Studies Course; the Combined Forces Air Component Commander Course, Maxwell Air Force Base; the Generals, Flag Officers and Ambassadors Course at the NATO Defense College; and the Senior Executives National and International Security Program at Harvard University. Bouchard also has a Bachelor of Arts Degree in Political Science from the University of Manitoba.

Bouchard retired from the Canadian Forces in April 2012. On 24 September 2013, Lockheed Martin announced Bouchard had been appointed "the country lead for Lockheed Martin Canada".

Medals and decorations
Bouchard's medal ribbons are as follows:

115px
113px
115px

 He was a qualified RCAF Pilot and as such wore the Royal Canadian Air Forces Pilot Wings

Notes

References

External links

  Canadian Forces Biography of Lieutenant-General J. J. C. "Charlie" Bouchard, CMM, CD (English)
NORAD – J.J.C. Bouchard, CMM, CD, CF
NATO – JFC Naples – Lieutenant General Charles Bouchard

|-

|-

Royal Canadian Air Force generals
Canadian Forces Air Command generals
Harvard University alumni
People of the First Libyan Civil War
Recipients of the Legion of Merit
University of Manitoba alumni
People from Saguenay, Quebec
Canadian military personnel from Quebec
Living people
1956 births
Commanders of the Order of Military Merit (Canada)